Eva Janina Wieczorek (born May 23, 1951) in Katowice in Poland. She is a visual artist.
She lives and works in Brühl, Germany.

Biography 
In Poland she finished an apprenticeship as a technician. When she was
young she was interested in painting, and her uncle, who was a painter, brought her in contact with the fine arts.
The artist studied privately  free art in the field of painting with Prof. Roman Kalarus at the Academy of Fine Arts ASP in Katowice Poland.
Starting with watercolours and acrylic paint she now works with oil on canvas paintings and Digital Paintings.

She  lives and works in Brühl Germany.

Exhibitions 
2005 Brühl Germany, "Wintertraum", Rathausgalerie,Single Exhibition 
2007 Brühl Germany, "Architektonische Aussichten", Orangerie Schloss Augustusburg, Single Exhibition
2008 Katowice Poland, "Woda, podróż i sen", Silesian Museum Katowice Poland, Single Exhibition
2009 Meisterschwanden Swiss, Kunst Portal International
2010 Brussels Belgium, Art Contemporary Gallery  Croissant, Studio d.v.o
2010 Punat Croatia, Gallery Tos, Single Exhibition
2011 London, Great Britain, Parallax Art Fair, La Galleria Pall Mall, Royal Opera Arcade, 
2011 Marl, Germany, Marler Kunststern 2011,
2014 Marl, Germany, Marler Kunststern 2014,
2015 Brühl Germany, "Schattenimpressionen", Rathausgalerie, Single Exhibition 
2015 Brühl Germany, "Because I am a Girl", Rathausgalerie
2016: Art fair contemporary art, PAN Museum Niederrhein,Emmerich
2017: Brühl Germany, "Dream and reality", Rathausgalerie, Emmerich
2017: Artist of the Year 2017, Internetgalerie, Airleben.de
2019: Open studio day in Brühl
2021: Open studio day in Brühl

Paintings in public possession 
  Silesian Museum, Katowice Poland (polish)
 Brühl (Rhineland], Germany

Literature 
 Catalog of the exhibition at National Library of Poland  (polish; German)
 
 Maria Fiderkiewicz: Wasser, Reise und Traum. Malerei von Eva Wieczorek / Woda, podróż i sen - Malarstwo Evy Wieczorek. Muzeum Slaskie, Katowice Poland 2008, .
 Łukasz Kałębasiak, Eva Wieczorek: Artystka z licencją na malowanie". Magazine: "Gazeta Wyborcza", Katowice Poland, 7 April 2007
 Britta Havlicek, "Zwischen Mensch und Natur". Magazine: "Kölner Stadt Anzeiger" "Rhein Erft", Cologne Germany. Nr.38, 24 April 2007
 Harald Zeyen, "Bilder mit Realismus und Elementen des Surrealismus. Magazine "Brühler Schlossbote", Brühl Germany 25. April 2007
 Tobias Gonszerowski: Brühler Fragebogen... mit Eva Wieczorek. Journal: "Brühler Fragenbogen", Brühl Germany Nr. 250, April 2008
 Harald Zeyen, "Lichtblicke in der Orangerie". Magazine: "Brühler Schlossbote", Brühl Germany 22. April 2009
 Claudia Grosse: Ein Spiel mit Licht und Schatten. Journal: "Kölner Stadt Anzeiger" . Colonia Germany. Nr. 91, 20. April 2009
 Hanna Styrie: Das Spiel von Licht und Schatten. Journal: Kölnische Rundschau, Colonia Germany. Nr. 91, 20. April 2009
 Prof. Jasna Rodin: Samostalna izložba Eve Wieczorek. Catalog from Gallery Toš, Verlag: Corngraf d.o.o Umag, Punat Croatia. 18.June 2010
 Harald Zeyen, "Spiel mit dem Schatten". Magazine "Brühler Schlossbote". 17. February 2015
 Gabi Ignor, "Eva Wieczorek Schattenimpressionen" Magazine "InBrühl" Der Veranstaltungs- und Tourismus Kalender, Nr. 64 January–March 2015

Grants

 2008: Silesian Museum, ( Solo Exhibition: Woda, podróż i sen), Curator: Maria Fiderkiewicz
 2011: Art prize Marler Kunststern 2011
 2014: Art prize Marler Kunststern 2014
 2017: Artist of the Year 2017, nominated, Internetgalerie, Airleben.de

External links
 Literature in the Polish National Library
 Literature in the German National Library
 Wikiart
 Kunstaspekte (German)
 Eva Janina Wieczorek Artprice.com

German women painters
1951 births
German contemporary artists
Living people
People from Katowice
21st-century German painters
People from Brühl (Rhineland)
21st-century German women artists